Eupithecia acolpodes is a moth in the  family Geometridae. It is found in India and Pakistan. Vladimir Mironov and Anthony Galsworthy place the species as part of the sinuosaria species group.

References

Moths described in 1938
acolpodes
Moths of Asia